Balloon is a town in Mopani District Municipality in the Limpopo province of South Africa.

References

Populated places in the Maruleng Local Municipality